During the 2006–07 Italian football season, Torino competed in Serie A.

Season summary
Despite leading Torino to promotion to Serie A the previous season, manager Gianni De Biasi was sacked 3 days before the start of the season. Alberto Zaccheroni came to Torino after two years of unemployment to take the helm. Six consecutive defeats led to Zaccheroni being sacked and De Biasi being reinstated as manager. Torino ultimately finished in 16th, avoiding relegation and an immediate return to Serie B by one point.

Kit
Torino's kit was manufactured by Asics and sponsored by insurance company Reale Mutua Assicurazioni.

First-team squad
Squad at end of season

Left club during season

Competitions

Serie A

References

Torino F.C. seasons
Torino F.C.